Merab Sharikadze (born 17 May 1993) is a Georgian rugby union player currently playing for Stade Aurillacois Cantal Auvergne in the Pro D2.

Early career
Merab Sharikadze began rugby in Tbilisi with the club 'Academia'. Aged just 16, he was called up to Georgia U18 team. In 2011, thanks to a partnership between the GRU and Hartpury College, Merab Sharikadze went to England to learn and play for Hartpury College R.F.C. Thanks to his strong performances, he was called up to play for Gloucester U19. The same year, he was named Georgia U19's captain. He made his full international debut on the 21 February 2012 against Spain, aged only 18, the 7th youngest player to be capped by Georgia.

Professional career
In September 2013, Merab Sharikadze joined the French side Union Sportive Bressane, just promoted in Pro D2, the French second division. The team finished on the bottom of the table and was relegated. Sharikadze signed to another Pro D2 side, Stade Aurillacois Cantal Auvergne and joined them during the summer 2014. At international level, the inside centre played his first game against a Tier1 nation in November 2014, against Ireland at Lansdowne Road. He showed his defensive skills, making 22 tackles during the game.

References

http://tier2rugby.blogspot.fr/2014/03/the-georgian-backline-hope-merab.html 
https://web.archive.org/web/20141220083959/http://www.thescore.ie/georgia-ireland-centre-irish-coaches-1778472-Nov2014/ 
http://www.espnscrum.com/scrum/rugby/player/160271.html
http://www.lerugbynistere.fr/videos/video-merab-sharikadze-casse-quatre-plaquages-samoans-donne-victoire-georgie-2611131828.php

1993 births
Living people
Rugby union centres
Expatriate rugby union players from Georgia (country)
Expatriate rugby union players in England
Expatriate rugby union players in France
Expatriate sportspeople from Georgia (country) in France
Expatriate sportspeople from Georgia (country) in England
Georgia international rugby union players
Union Sportive Bressane players
Stade Aurillacois Cantal Auvergne players
The Black Lion players